Löbnitz is a municipality in the Vorpommern-Rügen district, in Mecklenburg-Vorpommern, Germany.

References